Oleksandr Oleksandrovych Marchenko (14 January 1965 – 7 March 2022) was a Ukrainian politician. 

A member of Svoboda, he served in the Verkhovna Rada from 2014 to 2019. In 2014 he joined a militia unit to fight in the Russian-Ukrainian war. 

He was killed in action in Pushcha-Vodytsia, Kyiv, while fighting in the 2022 Russian invasion of Ukraine on 7 March, at the age of 57.

References

1965 births
2022 deaths
Eighth convocation members of the Verkhovna Rada
Interregional Academy of Personnel Management alumni
Ukrainian military personnel killed in the 2022 Russian invasion of Ukraine
People from Vinnytsia Oblast
Svoboda (political party) politicians